Micropontiidae is a family of copepods belonging to the order Siphonostomatoida.

Genera:
 Micropontius Gooding, 1957

References

Copepods